

41001–41100 

|-id=030
| 41030 Mariawomack ||  || Maria Womack (born 1963) is a researcher at the Florida Space Institute at the University of Central Florida (Orlando, FL). She has served as a professor at multiple universities and a program director for the National Science Foundation. Her research includes studies of comets and active centaurs. || 
|-id=049
| 41049 Van Citters ||  || G. Wayne Van Citters, American astronomer || 
|}

41101–41200 

|-id=107
| 41107 Ropakov ||  || Ivan V. Ropakov, grandfather of the second discoverer || 
|-id=184
| 41184 Devogèle ||  || Maxime Devogèle (born 1989) is a postdoctoral associate at Lowell Observatory who received his Ph.D. in 2017 from the Universite de Liège and the Universite Cote d'Azur. His work includes measuring the polarimetric properties of near-Earth and Main Belt asteroids. || 
|-id=199
| 41199 Wakanaootaki ||  || Wakana Ootaki (born 1984) is a Japanese vocalist and original member of the musical group "Kalafina". She has also performed with "FictionJunction". || 
|}

41201–41300 

|-id=206
| 41206 Sciannameo ||  || Francesco Sciannameo (born 1941), Italian professor of general surgery, head physician of the Terni hospital, and amateur astronomer || 
|-id=213
| 41213 Mimoun ||  || Alain Mimoun (1921–2013) was a French long-distance runner, and marathon champion at the 1956 Olympics in Melbourne. || 
|-id=279
| 41279 Trentman ||  || Richard Trentman (born 1939), American amateur astronomer and team member of the Powell Observatory Near-Earth-Object follow-up program || 
|}

41301–41400 

|-bgcolor=#f2f2f2
| colspan=4 align=center | 
|}

41401–41500 

|-id=450
| 41450 Medkeff ||  || Jeff Medkeff, American designer of software for robotic operations of observatories, telescope control, data reduction and automatic submission of results to the Minor Planet Center † || 
|-id=458
| 41458 Ramanjooloo ||  || Yudish Ramanjooloo (born 1985) is a Junior Researcher at the University of Hawaii in Honolulu, USA. His main research interests include studying near-Earth objects, and the interaction between solar wind and the induced magnetosphere of comets, and exoplanets. || 
|-id=481
| 41481 Musashifuchu ||  || Fuchu is the name of the place where Kokuhu (the ancient Japanese provincial government office) was located. Fuchu City in Tokyo Metropolis has been called Musashi Fuchu, because it was the Kokuhu of the province of Musashi. Its name symbolizes the history and culture of the city. || 
|-id=488
| 41488 Sindbad ||  || Sindbad, legendary sailor from Baghdad whose numerous fantastic adventures are recounted in The Arabian Nights || 
|}

41501–41600 

|-id=502
| 41502 Denchukun ||  || Denchukun is the official mascot character of Ibara city, Okayama, Japan. Its name originates from Denchu Hirakushi, a sculptor born in Ibara. Its shape represents a star in the famous Kabuki play Kagami-Jishi. || 
|}

41601–41700 

|-bgcolor=#f2f2f2
| colspan=4 align=center | 
|}

41701–41800 

|-id=740
| 41740 Yuenkwokyung || 2000 VC || Yuen Kwok-yung (born 1956) is a Hong Kong microbiologist, physician and surgeon, with over 700 publications in peer reviewed journals. During the global outbreak of SARS in 2003, he led his team in the discovery of the SARS coronavirus, being honored as "Asian heroes of the year" in the 2013 April issue of Time Asia. || 
|-id=742
| 41742 Wongkakui ||  || Wong Ka Kui (1962–1993) was a Hong Kong singer and songwriter, best known for being the lead vocalist, rhythm guitarist and main songwriter of the rock band Beyond, which he founded. || 
|-id=795
| 41795 Wiens ||  || Roger Wiens (born 1960) is deeply involved in space missions. He is the Principal Investigator behind ChemCam, a laser spectroscopy instrument on board the Mars Curiosity Rover. Name and citation provided by S. Le Mouelic. || 
|-id=800
| 41800 Robwilliams ||  || Robert A. Williams (b. 1942), American psychiatrist and author, director of the Biological Psychiatry Institute in Phoenix, Arizona || 
|}

41801–41900 

|-bgcolor=#f2f2f2
| colspan=4 align=center | 
|}

41901–42000 

|-id=927
| 41927 Bonal ||  || Lydie Bonal (born 1980) is a scientist at IPAG (Grenoble, France). She studies micrometeorites, mission samples, and Raman spectroscopy, with a focus on primitive matter, including organics, of planetary materials. || 
|-id=943
| 41943 Fredrick ||  || Richard Fredrick, American amateur astronomer and team member of the Powell Observatory Near-Earth-Object follow-up program || 
|-id=979
| 41979 Lelumacri ||  || Luca Pacciorini (born 1958), his partner Cristina Conedera (born 1965) and their two children, Letizia (born 2000) and Martino (born 2002), are friends of the discoverer. || 
|-id=981
| 41981 Yaobeina ||  || Yao Beina (1981–2015) was a talented and courageous Chinese singer who won numerous awards for the best Chinese pop song performance. One of Yao's famous songs, "Fire of the Heart", was about the reflections on her battle with breast cancer. She donated her corneas. || 
|-id=986
| 41986 Fort Bend ||  || Fort Bend Astronomy Club of Stafford, Texas, USA, several of whose members are asteroid discoverers (J. L. Casady, A. Cruz, P. Garossino, C. Gustava, A. Lowe, D. Wells) || 
|-id=988
| 41988 Emilyjoseph ||  || Emily C. S. Joseph (born 1988), an American planetary scientist and member of the VIMS instrument team for the Cassini–Huygens spaceprobe at the University of Arizona. As a public health researcher, she also took part in the university's COVID–19 response. || 
|}

References 

041001-042000